The 2019–20 Campeonato Nacional Feminino (also known as Liga BPI for sponsorship reasons) is the 35th edition of Campeonato Nacional Feminino.

On 8 April 2020 the Portuguese Football Federation cancelled all non-professional competitions in the country due to the COVID-19 pandemic in Portugal. No titles were awarded, and no teams will be promoted or relegated. Benfica was later appointed to the UEFA Champions League qualifying round as table leaders at the time of interruption.

On 19 October 2019 Benfica hosted the first official female Derby de Lisboa on Estádio da Luz against Sporting CP. The game ended 3–0 for the home team and established a new attendance record of 12,812 people on a women's football match in Portugal.

Teams 

Twelve teams compete in the league – ten teams from the 2018–19 Campeonato Nacional, as well as two teams promoted from the Campeonato de Promoção.

The team changes were the following:

 Boavista and Vilaverdense were the teams relegated, finishing 11th and 12th, respectively.
 Benfica, the winner of Campeonato Nacional II Divisão and Cadima, were the teams promoted.

Stadia and locations

Season Summary

League table 
Season abandoned after 15 match days.

Positions by round

The table lists the positions of teams after each week of matches. In order to preserve chronological evolvements, any postponed matches are not included to the round at which they were originally scheduled, but added to the full round they were played immediately afterwards.

Results

Statistics

Top scorers

References

External links 

 official website (fpf)

2019-20
Por
women's
Camp|
Portugal